This is a list of earthquakes in 1947. Only magnitude 6.0 or greater earthquakes appear on the list. Lower magnitude events are included if they have caused death, injury or damage. Events which occurred in remote areas will be excluded from the list as they wouldn't have generated significant media interest. All dates are listed according to UTC time. Although a fairly busy year in terms of magnitude 7.0+ events, the death toll was relatively low at 745. Up to 733 deaths were attributed to two events in Iran and Peru. The largest events measured 7.6 which compared with recent years was quite modest. Magnitude 7.0+ earthquakes were generally spread around the world with Indonesia seeing the most.

Overall

By death toll 

 Note: At least 10 casualties

By magnitude 

 Note: At least 7.0 magnitude

Notable events

January

February

March

April

May

June

July

August

September

October

November

December

References

1947
 
1947